Visconde do Rio Branco is a Brazilian municipality in the state of Minas Gerais. As of 2020 its population is estimated to be 42,965.

History
The Purian languages, now extinct, were formerly spoken in and around what is now Visconde do Rio Branco.

Visconde do Rio Branco was founded in 1810 and had been called by the name "São João". The little village was growing up till 1839 when it finally was recognized as a true village. At 1881 was elevated to City and subordinate to Ubá (the most industrial city of the micro-region) and it received the actual name Visconde do Rio Branco.

Economy
The city is based on an agrarian economy. Sugarcane plantations was a great attractive factor of the progress of all the farms and industry of the city.

See also
 List of municipalities in Minas Gerais

References

Municipalities in Minas Gerais